Strange Justice may refer to:
 Strange Justice (1999 film), a television film
 Strange Justice (1932 film), an American pre-Code drama film